Thomas Commerford Martin (July 22, 1856 – May 17, 1924) was an American electrical engineer and editor.

Martin was born in Limehouse, England. His father worked with Lord Kelvin and other pioneers of submarine telegraph cables, and Martin worked on the cable-laying ship SS Great Eastern.

Educated as a theological student, Martin travelled to the United States in 1877.  
He was associated with Thomas A. Edison in his work in 1877–1879 and thereafter engaged in editorial work. From 1883 to 1909 he served as editor of the Electrical World, after 1909 was executive secretary of the National Electric Light Association, and in 1900–1911 was a special agent of the United States Census Office.

Martin lectured at the Royal Institution of Engineers, London, the Paris Société Internationale des Electriciens, the University of Nebraska, and Columbia University.  
He was a founding member  of the American Institute of Electrical Engineers, and served as president in 1887–1888.


Publications
 The Electric Motor and Its Applications (1887; third edition, 1888), with Joseph Wetzler
 Edison, His Life and Inventions, (1910), with Frank Lewis Dyer
 The Inventions, Researches, and Writings of Nikola Tesla (1893; third edition, 1894)
 The Story of Electricity, 1919 (ed) with Stephen Leidy Coles
 Reminiscences Of Pioneer Days In St. Paul with Frank Moore,

References

Sources
T. C. Martin biography retrieved December 1, 2009

External links
 
 
 

American biographers
American magazine editors
American engineers
English emigrants to the United States
1856 births
1924 deaths